The following is the solo discography of British rock musician Roger Daltrey.

Studio albums

Live albums

Compilation albums

Collaborations

Soundtracks

Singles

As lead artist

As featured artist

Notes

References

External links

Rock music discographies
Discographies of British artists